Maurice John Dauglish (2 October 1867 – 30 April 1922) was an English first-class cricketer active 1886–90 who played for Middlesex and Oxford University as a right-handed batsman and wicketkeeper. He was born in St Pancras, London; died in Hunton Bridge.

References

1867 births
1922 deaths
English cricketers
Middlesex cricketers
Oxford University cricketers
Gentlemen of England cricketers
Berkshire cricketers
People educated at Harrow School
Alumni of Magdalen College, Oxford